Siniša Anđelković (born 13 February 1986) is a Slovenian footballer who plays as a defender.

Club career

Early career in Slovenia
Born in Kranj, Andjelković started his career in his hometown Kranj playing at local club Triglav. In 2008, he joined Drava Ptuj where he made his debut in the top division of Slovenian football, 1. SNL. He was a member of Drava for a season and a half and earned 54 appearances for the club in Slovenian top-flight scoring 1 goal. During the winter transfer window of 2009–10 season he was acquired by Maribor where he soon established himself in the first team. In two seasons with Maribor he played a total of 30 matches scoring 2 goals in the 1. SNL.

Palermo and loans
In late November 2010 it was announced by Zlatko Zahovič, Maribor's sport director, that Serie A side Palermo were in advanced talks to sign Anđelković permanently. The transfer was made official on 7 December 2010. The transfer fee paid by Palermo was undisclosed but it was said to be the record transfer fee paid for a defender from 1. SNL. In Palermo's financial filing in the Chamber of Commerce of Palermo, the transfer fee was €1.2 million.

On 12 January 2011, Anđelković made his debut for Palermo, playing the whole 90 minutes in the Coppa Italia round of 16 game against Chievo; the match ended in a 1–0 win for the Sicilians.

On 16 August 2011 he moved on loan to Serie B club Ascoli. The following year he goes on loan to another Serie B club Modena. He returned to recently relegated Serie B club Palermo at the end of the season, after his Modena loan expired, ensuring immediately a place in the starting lineup alongside Ezequiel Muñoz and Claudio Terzi.

Padova
On 9 January 2019, he joined a Serie B club Padova on a 1.5-year contract. On 31 January 2022, the contract between Padova and Anđelković was terminated by mutual consent.

International career
Anđelković made his senior international debut for Slovenia on 9 February 2011, appearing in a friendly game against Albania in a squad that also included Palermo teammates Armin Bačinović and Josip Iličić. The game ended in a 2–1 win for his side.

Career statistics

Club

International

References

External links

NZS profile 

1986 births
Living people
Sportspeople from Kranj
Slovenian people of Serbian descent
Slovenian footballers
Association football defenders
NK Triglav Kranj players
NK Drava Ptuj players
NK Maribor players
Palermo F.C. players
Ascoli Calcio 1898 F.C. players
Modena F.C. players
Venezia F.C. players
Calcio Padova players
Slovenian Second League players
Slovenian PrvaLiga players
Serie A players
Serie B players
Serie C players
Slovenian expatriate footballers
Slovenian expatriate sportspeople in Italy
Expatriate footballers in Italy
Slovenia youth international footballers
Slovenia international footballers